Saïd Arab (born 23 July 2000) is a French professional footballer who plays as a midfielder for Algerian club ES Sétif.

Career
Arab began playing football locally with Racing Club de France, before joining the youth academy of Boulogne-Billancourt, and then training with ASM Oran in Algeria. He returned to France to the youth academy of USA Clichy, before training at Paris Saint-Germain  and Metz. He signed his first senior contract with Red Star in 2018. Arab made his professional debut with Red Star in a 1–0 Ligue 2 loss to Niort on 17 May 2019. On 13 June 2020, he transferred to Paris FC, signing a contract for 3 years.

On 31 January 2022, Arab joined Bastia-Borgo on loan.

Personal life
Born in France, Arab is of Algerian descent.

Career statistics

References

External links
 

2000 births
Footballers from Paris
French sportspeople of Algerian descent
Living people
French footballers
Association football midfielders
Racing Club de France Football players
AC Boulogne-Billancourt players
ASM Oran players
Paris Saint-Germain F.C. players
Red Star F.C. players
Paris FC players
FC Bastia-Borgo players
ES Sétif players
Ligue 2 players
Championnat National players
Championnat National 3 players
French expatriate footballers
Expatriate footballers in Algeria
French expatriate sportspeople in Algeria